Juvisy-sur-Orge (literally Juvisy on Orge) is a commune in the Essonne department in Île-de-France in northern France. It is located 18 km south-east of Paris, a few kilometres south of Orly Airport.

The site of the town has been occupied from ancient times; it is noted in Julius Caesar's book about the Gallic Wars. Centuries later, it became an important place under the French monarchy, as a royal hotel. It would also be used as a post relay, the first one on the road to Fontainebleau.  It became a major road and railway junction in the 1840s after its railway station was built in 1840, and after 1893 was the first city surrounding Paris with a bridge crossing the river Seine.

Most of the city was destroyed in April 1944 by an Allied bombing as the city was the only one surrounding Paris that had such a big railway station and had railway lines going to most of France's major cities.  It was then rebuilt between 1945 and the 1970s.

The city is today known for Gare de Juvisy, the fourth largest and most-frequented railway station in the Grand Paris.

Geography
Neighboring communes:
 Athis-Mons
 Draveil
 Savigny-sur-Orge
 Viry-Châtillon

The city is located 18 km south from Paris, in the Grand Paris. It has access from the National Road N°.7 (Route nationale 7) and is 10 km north of Évry.

Juvisy-sur-Orge is served by Juvisy station on Paris RER (Réseau express régional, i.e. Regional Express Network) lines C and D.

History
Starting from 1883, Juvisy-sur-Orge is the location of astronomer Camille Flammarion's observatory, which today belongs to the Société astronomique de France.
The town is also the site of the 1740 Pyramid erected to memorialize the work of Jean Picard and Nicolas Louis de Lacaille in measuring the Earth's circumference.

It is the burial site of author Raymond Queneau, also now represented by the Bibliothèque-Médiathèque Raymond Queneau.

Population

Notable people
Jean-Jacques Annaud, film director
Emmanuelle Charpentier, biochemist, discovery CRISPR, Nobel laureate in Chemistry, 2020. 
Christophe, singer 
Amedy Coulibaly, one of three perpetrators in the January 2015 Île-de-France attacks
Ouparine Djoco, footballer
Ladji Doucouré, athlete
Camille Flammarion, astronomer
Gabrielle Renaudot Flammarion (1877-1962), astronomer. 
Alexandre Prémat, motor racing driver
Ferdinand Quénisset (1872-1951), astronomer.
Sophian Rafai, basketball player
Habib Sissoko, footballer

See also
Communes of the Essonne department
1909 European Rowing Championships

References

External links

Official website 

Mayors of Essonne Association 

Communes of Essonne